Impur is an album by English guitarist, composer and improvisor Fred Frith. It was composed in 1996 by Frith "for 100 musicians, large building and mobile audience"  and was performed on 30 May 1996 by students and teachers from L’Ecole Nationale de Musique, Villeurbanne, France. Frith directed the performance but did perform himself.

Impur is the first of two performances commissioned by L’Ecole Nationale de Musique while Frith was resident music professor at the institution. The second was Impur II (2009).

Background
Between 1994 and 1996, Frith was Composer-in-Residence at L’Ecole Nationale de Musique in Villeurbanne, France. At the end of the two-year residency, Frith organised a musical event at the school involving as many students as possible. He grouped them according to their music disciplines and placed them in all the rooms of a music building. Each group of musicians then played music Frith had prepared for them or, when required, improvised.  Using synchronized stopwatches, all the groups, who could not hear each other, played strictly according to a 55-minute time-score that Frith had written. During the concert the public was invited to wander from room to room, or sit in the courtyard and listen to the sounds from the open windows. The whole performance was recorded on four ADAT recorders and later mixed.

Downtown Music Gallery wrote of this album:

Track listing
"Impur"  (Frith) – 54:56

Personnel

Directors
Fred Frith – chamber orchestra section
Sophie Dufeutrelle – flutes section
Catherine Guinamard – recorders section
Pascal Pariaud – clarinets section
Nasser Saïdani – African percussion section
David Wood – Ensemble Hétéroclite

Performers
Samuel Chagnard – soprano saxophone, bass clarinet
Alain Chaléard – tabla
Patrick Charbonnier – trombone
Laurent Frick – trumpet
Bader Gharzouli – electric guitar
Stephane Grosjean – percussion
Joël Jorda – clarinet
Ghilem Lacroux – electric guitar
Stéphane Lambert – alto saxophone
Gilles Laval – electric guitar
Catherine Leuchter – recorder
Laure Michel – recorder
Claire Mollard – percussion
Guillaume Quemener – electric guitar
Franklin Riboud – electric guitar
Fatiha Semaïl – recorder
Laurent Vichard – clarinet
Denis Mariotte – drums
Jean-Michel Quoisse – bass guitar

Engineers
Myles Boisen – mastering
Peter Hardt – mixing
Emmanuel Gilot – recording
Laurent Luci – recording assistant

References

External links

Albums produced by Fred Frith
Fred Frith live albums
2006 live albums
Fred Records live albums